Anania alta is a moth in the family Crambidae. It was described by Koen V. N. Maes in 2005. It is found in Cameroon, the Democratic Republic of the Congo, Equatorial Guinea (Bioko) and Uganda.

References

Moths described in 2005
Pyraustinae
Moths of Africa